Truxalis is a genus of grasshoppers in the family Acrididae, subfamily Acridinae and tribe Truxalini.  Species can be found in: Africa, the Iberian peninsula, Asia minor through to Indo-China.

Species
The Orthoptera Species File and Catalogue of Life list:
Truxalis afghana Bey-Bienko, 1963
Truxalis annulata Thunberg, 1815
Truxalis arabica Uvarov, 1933
Truxalis bolivari Dirsh, 1950
Truxalis burtti Dirsh, 1950
Truxalis conspurcata Klug, 1840
Truxalis eximia Eichwald, 1830
Truxalis fitzgeraldi Dirsh, 1950
Truxalis grandis Klug, 1830
Truxalis guangzhouensis Liang, 1989
Truxalis huangliuensis Liu & Li, 1995
Truxalis indica Bolívar, 1902
Truxalis johnstoni Dirsh, 1950
Truxalis longicornis Krauss, 1902
Truxalis mesopotamica Dirsh, 1950
Truxalis nasuta Linnaeus, 1758 - type species (as Gryllus nasutus Linnaeus)
Truxalis obesa Bey-Bienko, 1960
Truxalis philbyi Dirsh, 1951
Truxalis procera Klug, 1830
Truxalis robusta Uvarov, 1916
Truxalis rubripennis Dirsh, 1950
Truxalis siamensis Dirsh, 1950
Truxalis viridifasciata Krauss, 1902

Gallery

References

External links
 
 Guide to N. African spp. of Truxalis Fabricius, 1775 (in French)

Acridinae
Acrididae genera